Cochylimorpha fuscimacula is a species of moth of the family Tortricidae. It is found in China (Shaanxi, Xinjiang) and Russia.

The wingspan is 11–16 mm. Adults have been recorded on wing in July.

References

Moths described in 1963
Cochylimorpha
Moths of Asia